Yahia (Arabic: يحيى‎, romanized: Yaḥyā), is a common Arabic male given name also written as Yahya or Yehia.  People with the name include:

Given name
Yahia Badreddin al-Houthi (born c. 1965), political leader of the Zaidi rebels in Yemen 
Yahia Belaskri (born 1952), Algerian novelist
Yahia Ben Bakr (born 9th century), Mozarab (Iberian Christian living under Muslim domination) figure in Medieval Portugal
Yahia Ben Rabbi (c. 1150–1222), also known as Yahya Ha-Nasi, Yahya Ibn Yaish, Dom Yahia "o Negro", direct descendant of the Exilarchs of Babylon, the eponymous ancestor of the Ibn Yahya family
Yahia Boushaki (1935-1960), Algerian politician and military
Yehia El-Fakharany (born 1945), Egyptian TV and movie actor
Yahia El-Mekachari (born 1990), Tunisian light heavyweight amateur boxer, Olympian 
Yahia Kébé (born 1985), Burkinabé football player
Yahia Ouahabi (born 1940), Algerian football player
Yahia Shakmak (born 1985), Libyan basketball player
Yahia Turki (1903–1969), Tunisian painter

Surname
Alaeddine Yahia (born 1981), French-Tunisian football player
Antar Yahia (born 1982), Algerian football player
Karim Naït Yahia (born 1980), Algerian football player
Latif Yahia (born 1964), Iraqi-born author and former combatant in the Iran-Iraq War, and alleged body double of Saddam Hussein's eldest son Uday Hussein
Rafik Haj Yahia (1949–2000), Israeli Arab politician, member of the Knesset

Pen name
Adnan Oktar (born 1956), Turkish creationist and cult leader, also known as "Harun Yahya"

See also
Yihyah
Yahya (name)